Stefan Haben (born April 2, 1987) is a German footballer who plays for FC Karbach.

External links

1987 births
Living people
German footballers
Eintracht Frankfurt II players
SSV Reutlingen 05 players
SC Fortuna Köln players
TuS Koblenz players
Birmingham–Southern College alumni
3. Liga players
Association football central defenders